The San Diego Chargers announced their 40th Anniversary Team in 2000 to honor the top players and coaches in the history of the National Football League team. The Chargers began play in 1960 as part of the American Football League. The anniversary team included 31 players and coaches voted on by fans and a media panel. Four of the players were active on the 2000 Chargers squad. The team became the Los Angeles Chargers after relocating in 2017.

Key

Offense

Defense

Special teams

Coaches

See also
 San Diego Chargers 50th Anniversary Team
 Los Angeles Chargers Hall of Fame

Notes

References

San Diego Chargers 50th Anniversary Team
Anniversary Team 40th
San Diego Chargers 40th Anniversary Team
2000-related lists